Boffzen is a Samtgemeinde ("collective municipality") in the district of Holzminden, in Lower Saxony, Germany. Its seat is in the municipality Boffzen.

The Samtgemeinde Boffzen consists of the following municipalities:

 Boffzen
 Derental 
 Fürstenberg 
 Lauenförde

Samtgemeinden in Lower Saxony